Cong Zheyu is a former Chinese footballer who played as a forward for the Chinese national football team. He was the first coach of the China women's football team.

Career statistics

International

International goals
Scores and results list China's goal tally first.

References

1934 births
Living people
Footballers from Dalian
Chinese footballers
Association football forwards
Beijing Guoan F.C. players
China international footballers
Chinese football managers
China women's national football team managers